This was the first edition of the tournament, Ivan Dodig won the title beating Benoît Paire in the final 7–5, 6–1.

Seeds

Draw

Finals

Top half

Bottom half

References
 Main draw
 Qualifying draw

2015 ATP Challenger Tour